Catherine King  may refer to:

Catherine King (radio broadcaster) (1904–2000), Australian broadcaster
Catherine King (mezzo-soprano) English singer
Catherine King (politician) (born 1966), Australian politician
Catherine King (scientist), Australian ecotoxicologist who studies sub-Antarctic and Antarctic regions
Kaki King (born 1979), American guitarist and composer

See also
Cathy King (born 1959), Canadian curler
Kitty King (born 1982)  British Olympic eventing rider
Katie King (disambiguation)